The following is the list of Ambassadors and High Commissioners of Malaysia. High Commissioners represent member states of the Commonwealth of Nations and ambassadors represent other states. Note that some diplomats are accredited by, or to, more than one country.

Current ambassadors of Malaysia

Bold indicates the resident countries of the Malaysian diplomatic missions.

See also
 Foreign relations of Malaysia
 List of diplomatic missions of Malaysia

References

 
Malaysia